Pierre Kwenders is the stage name of José Louis Modabi (born October 31, 1985 in Kinshasa, Democratic Republic of the Congo), a Congolese-Canadian musician. His 2014 album Le Dernier empereur bantou was a shortlisted nominee for the Juno Award for World Music Album of the Year at the Juno Awards of 2015, and a longlisted nominee for the 2015 Polaris Music Prize. Kwenders, who sings and raps in English, French, Lingala and Tshiluba, is noted for blending both African music and western pop music influences, including hip hop and electronic music, into his style.

Career
After immigrating to Canada with his mother as a teenager, he first attracted widespread attention for his guest contributions to Radio Radio's 2012 album Havre de Grace.

He released the EPs Whiskey & Tea and African Dream in 2013, and followed up with Le Dernier empereur bantou, his first full-length album, in 2014. He supported the album with a cross-Canada tour in 2015. His song "Mardi Gras", a collaboration with Jacques Alphonse "Jacobus" Doucet of Radio Radio, was a shortlisted nominee for the 2015 SOCAN Songwriting Prize in the francophone division.

He collaborated with Boogat on "Londres", a track on Boogat's 2015 album Neo-Reconquista.

His second full-length album, Makanda at the End of Space, the Beginning of Time, was released in 2017. The album was a shortlisted finalist for the 2018 Polaris Music Prize.

In 2018, he had his first acting role in the film Les Salopes, or the Naturally Wanton Pleasure of Skin.

He won  the 2022 Polaris Music Prize  for his album José Louis and the Paradox of Love.

References

External links

1985 births
Canadian world music musicians
Canadian electronic musicians
21st-century Black Canadian male singers
Democratic Republic of the Congo emigrants to Canada
21st-century Democratic Republic of the Congo male singers
People from Kinshasa
Living people
French-language singers of Canada
Canadian male film actors
Male actors from Montreal
Canadian male rappers
21st-century Canadian rappers
Singers from Montreal
Fontana North artists
Polaris Music Prize winners